The Wild Adventures of Blinky Bill is an Australian animated television series based on Dorothy Wall's books about Blinky Bill, and a sequel series to the 2015 film Blinky Bill the Movie.

Plot
Blinky Bill is back to bring his trademark mischief, mayhem, and humour to life. Along with his best mate and sidekick Jacko, Blinky takes on the role as defender of his outback home, Greenpatch.

Characters
Blinky Bill (voiced by Cam Ralph) – an 11-year-old koala who is the main protagonist.
Jacko Browing (voiced by Akmal Saleh) – a frill-necked lizard is Blinky's sidekick and best friend.
Nutsy Koala (voiced by Bridie Connell) – a young female koala that is Blinky's closest friend. 
Cranky (voiced by Peter McAllum) – a tyrannical goanna is Blinky's nemesis and the mayor of Greenpatch.
Juan Pablo (voiced by Rupert Degas) – a Paraguayan parrot. 
Bandi (voiced by Rupert Degas) – a mischievous bandicoot. 
Coot (voiced by Cam Ralph) – another mischievous bandicoot.
Mr. Wombat (voiced by Jim Pike) – a wombat and Blinky's mentor.
Claude (voiced by Ash Ricardo) – a feral cat and Blinky's other nemesis
Eddy (voiced by Rupert Degas) – an American squirrel. 
Robert (voiced by Cam Ralph) – a lyrebird and one of Blinky's friends.
Marcia (voiced by Charlotte Hamlyn) – a marsupial mouse and one of Blinky's friends.
Sugar (voiced by Bridie Connell) – a sugar glider and one of Blinky's friends.
Spike (voiced by Nathan Harvey) – an echidna and one of Blinky's friends.
Mrs. Bill (voiced by Beth Armstrong) – a koala who is Blinky's mother.
Ms. Tibbins (voiced by Beth Armstrong) – a kiwi bird who is a school teacher.
Bill Koala (voiced by Jamie Croft) – a koala who is Blinky's father only mentioned on the episodes and he appears in "Home to Roost".
San Jorge (voiced by Tin Pang) – a sulphur-crested cockatoo.
Roddy MacBill – a koala and is Blinky Bill's uncle he plays the bagpipes.
Bob – was a friend of Jacko, years later he is dead. Killed for Hunts Hunters.
Uncle Jack – a frill-necked lizard and Jacko's uncle.
Echo – a gecko barrowing Robert's glasses.
Bluey (voiced by Coco Jack Gillies) – is a blue footed booby.
Bell (voiced by Stuart Brown) – TBA
Doris Cranklepot – is Cranky's mother
Whoogle – is an owl.
Kev – a koala who becomes a Guardian of Greenpatch.
Mr. Owl – is Whoogle's father.
Priscilla – is a frog.
Midge – is a grasshopper.
Eagle – is a wedge tailed eagle.
Crocodiles – are saltwater crocodiles.

Episodes

International Broadcast

Broadcast
The Wild Adventures of Blinky Bill debuted on 7TWO in Australia on 5 December 2016. The series aired on teleTOON+ in Poland on 16 January 2017. In Hungary, it began airing on Minimax on 19 June 2017. In Latin America debuted on Nat Geo Kids on 1 July 2017 and Brazil on 1 September 2017. In Canada debuted on Ici Radio-Canada Télé on 9 September 2017., In United Kingdom it debuted on Pop in 2018., In Italy it debuted on Pop in 2018., In Germany it debuted on KiKA on 1 January 2018.

Home Media Releases

DVD releases
 Blinky the Brave and Other Wild Tales (2018)
 The Escape and Other Wild Tales (2018)
 Mission Impossumable and Other Wild Tales (2018)

Notes

References

External links

7two original programming
Australian children's animated adventure television series
Australian children's animated comedy television series
Australian computer-animated television series
2016 Australian television series debuts
2017 Australian television series endings
Fictional duos
2010s Australian animated television series
Animated television series about children
Television series about koalas
Australian television shows based on children's books
Blinky Bill
English-language television shows